Ivo Michael Beale Neame (born 13 March 1981) is a British jazz pianist and composer. In addition to leading his own bands he is a member of several European jazz groups including Phronesis, the Marius Neset Quintet, and the Kairos 4Tet.   He is a Professor of Jazz Piano at the Guildhall School of Music and Drama.

Biography 

Neame, a grandson of composer Shena Fraser, was born in Kent into the Shepherd Neame brewing family. He attended The King's School, Canterbury, and studied jazz saxophone at London's Royal Academy of Music in a year-group that included pianist Gwilym Simcock, and was mentored by Martin Speake and Steve Buckley, as well as F-IRE Collective founder Barak Schmool and Milton Mermikides.

Since leaving RAM in 2003 Ivo has performed with highly esteemed musicians at home and abroad such as David Binney, Kenny Wheeler and Hermeto Pascoal. He has played on more than 40 albums as a sideman and a leader and tours regularly with his quintet, octet and now solo piano, as well as with Phronesis and Marius Neset. Ivo was made an Associate of the Royal Academy of Music in 2013.

Honours 
2018: Nominated for "Jazz Composition for Small Ensemble", BASCA Composer Awards
2017: "Jazz Ensemble of the Year", Parliamentary Jazz Awards (Phronesis)
2014: Nominated for "Best Jazz Act", MOBO Awards (Phronesis)
2013: Awarded ARAM
2012: "Best Jazz Act" - London Awards for Art and Performance (Phronesis)
2012: Nominated for "UK Jazz Instrumentalist of the year" , Jazz FM awards
2012: Nominated for "Album of the Year", Parliamentary Jazz Awards (Phronesis)
2011: "Best Jazz Act", MOBO Awards (Kairos Quartet)
2010: "Album of the year" in Jazzwise Magazine (Phronesis - Alive)
2010: "Album of the year" in MOJO Magazine (Phronesis - Alive)

Discography

Own compositions 
2018: Moshka – Ivo Neame Quartet (Edition Records)
2015: Strata – Ivo Neame Quintet (Whirlwind Recordings)
2012: Yatra – Ivo Neame Octet (Edition Records)
2009: Caught in the Light of Day – Ivo Neame Quartet (Edition Records)
2007: Swirls and Eddies – Ivo Neame Trio (Loop Records)

Collaborations 
Within Phronesis, piano trio
2018: We Are All (Edition Records)
2017: The Behemoth (Edition Records)
2016: Parallax (Edition Records)
2014: Life to Everything (Edition Records)
2012: Walking Dark (Edition Records)
2010: Alive (Edition Records)
2007: Organic Warfare (Loop Records)
2009: Green Delay (Loop Records)

Within Kairos 4Tet, led by Adam Waldmann
2013: Everything We Hold (Naim Records)
2011: Statement of Intent (Edition Records)

Within Dave Manington's Riff Raff
2018: Challenger Deep (Loop Records)
2013: Hullabaloo (Loop Records)
2008: Headrush (Loop Records)

Within Marius Neset
2017: Circle of Chimes (ACT Recordings)
2016: Snowmelt (ACT Recordings)
2014: Pinball (ACT Recordings)
2013: Birds (Edition Records)

Within Gemini, quartet led by Jim Hart
2009: Narrada (Loop Records)
2007: Emergence (Loop Records)

With other projects
2018: Tonadas – Julian Argüelles (Edition Records)
2018: Life I know – Ant Law (Edition Records)
2016: Roots of Unity – Escape Hatch with Andrea di Biase (Whirlwind Recordings)
2016: The Darkening Blue – Andre Canniere (Whirlwind Recordings)
2015: Zero Sum World – Ant Law (Whirlwind Recordings)
2014: Coalescence – Andre Canniere (Whirlwind Recordings)
2012: Beginnings - Josh Arcoleo (Edition Records)
2008: Flying Dreams – Brigitte Beraha (F-ire Records)
2007: Different Smile – Kaz Simmons (Fast Awake Records)

Bands 
 Ivo Neame Quartet 
 Phronesis
 Marius Neset
 Dave Manington's Riff Raff
 Julian Argüelles Quartet
 Ant Law

References

External links 
 

English jazz pianists
English jazz saxophonists
British male saxophonists
1981 births
Living people
Alumni of the Royal Academy of Music
Post-bop pianists
Edition artists
ACT Music artists
21st-century saxophonists
British male pianists
21st-century pianists
21st-century British male musicians
British male jazz musicians
Phronesis (band) members
Edition Records artists
Whirlwind Recordings artists